Spectacle Lake Provincial Park is a provincial park in British Columbia, Canada, comprising c. 54 ha. and located southeast of Shawnigan Lake on southern Vancouver Island.

References

Provincial parks of British Columbia
Cowichan Valley
Protected areas established in 1963
1963 establishments in British Columbia